Bartley "Bart" Creasman (born June 8, 1983 in Lake Mary, Florida, United States) is an American former professional soccer goalkeeper who last played for the USL Second Division club Wilmington Hammerheads. Creasman holds two goalkeeping records at his high school, with 258 saves during the 2001 season and 720 saves in total throughout his Lake Mary Soccer career between 1998 and 2001. He joined the Hammerheads in 2004 after playing in the USL Premier Development League with Richmond Kickers Future and Raleigh CASL Elite. He played his collegiate soccer at Davidson College.

References
General

Specific

1983 births
Living people
American soccer players
Richmond Kickers Future players
North Carolina FC U23 players
USL Second Division players
Wilmington Hammerheads FC players
USL League Two players
Davidson Wildcats men's soccer players
Soccer players from Florida
Sportspeople from Seminole County, Florida
Association football goalkeepers
People from Lake Mary, Florida